Charles "Chugger" Adair (born August 11, 1971) is a retired American soccer player and current soccer coach. He spent two seasons in the Continental Indoor Soccer League, two in the National Professional Soccer League and seven in the USISL A-League / USL First Division.

Early life and education 
Adair grew up in Chula Vista where he played soccer as a youth.  When he was five, he underwent open heart surgery.  Adair attended Hilltop High School.  He was inducted into the Hilltop Hall of Fame in 2001.  In 1989, he entered San Diego State University where he played one seasons with the men's soccer team.  He then transferred to the University of San Diego and played with the Toreros for three seasons.  In 1992, Adair's senior season, San Diego went to the NCAA championship where they fell to the Virginia Cavaliers.  During his three seasons with USD, Adair scored 27 goals and added 23 assists in 57 games.

Playing career 
On April 7, 1993, the San Diego Sockers selected Adair in the first round of the 1993 Continental Indoor Soccer League Draf].  After scoring ten goals in six games, Adair left he Sockers for a trial with Belgium club Ghent the first week of July.  He spent most of his time in Belgium with Ghent's reserve team, but played one exhibition game, scoring a goal, with the first team.  When Ghent did not offer him a contract, Adair returned to the Sockers in time for the playoffs.  The Sockers went on to win the CISL championship.  After going on a post-season tour of Switzerland with the Sockers, Adair signed with the Wichita Wings of the National Professional Soccer League in January 1994.  He scored fourteen goals in fourteen games then tore his anterior cruciate ligament in March, putting him out for nearly a year.  In June 1995, Adair returned to playing with the Sockers.  In March 1996, the Los Angeles Galaxy selected Adair in the third round (26th overall) of the 1996 MLS Supplemental Draft.  The Galaxy waived him on March 25, 1996.  He then signed with the Carolina Dynamo of the USISL a month later.  On February 26, 1997, he signed with the Milwaukee Wave of the NPSL. In April, he moved to the Seattle Sounders of the USISL A-League.  He had reconstructive knee surgery and lost the 1998 season.  In 1999, he played for the San Diego Flash.  He returned for the 2000 season, but recurring knee problems limited him to 91 minutes in five games.  The Flash released him in August and he immediately signed with the Minnesota Thunder.  In 2001, he was back in San Diego, this time with San Diego FC.  In March 2002, he signed with the Portland Timbers.

Coaching career 
Prior to retiring Adair began coaching. In 1996, he coached the Bonita Vista High School boys team. He was assistant coach with the University of San Diego men's team, his alma-mater, from 1998 to 2000. He was then the assistant coach of both the men's and women's teams at Pacific University. In 2003, he was assistant coach of the San Diego Spirit women's professional team. Adair was associate head coach of the UC Santa Barbara women's team for two seasons. Adair was the assistant for the women's team at Virginia Tech. In 2011 he was promoted to head coach of the team.

Lawsuit over National Anthem Benching 
In March 2021, Adair was sued by a former player, Kiersten Hening, for allegedly benching her, subjecting her to repeated verbal abuse, and forcing her off the team because she refused to kneel in support of the Black Lives Matter organization.  The trial court denied Adair's motion for summary judgment on December 2, 2022, allowing the case to proceed to trial. In January 2023, Adair agreed to pay over $100,000 to settle the lawsuit.

References

External links 
 Virginia Tech biography
 UC Santa Barbara Gauchos biography

1971 births
Living people
American expatriate soccer players
American expatriate sportspeople in Belgium
American soccer coaches
American soccer players
Association football forwards
Continental Indoor Soccer League players
Expatriate footballers in Belgium
LA Galaxy draft picks
Milwaukee Wave players
Minnesota Thunder players
National Professional Soccer League (1984–2001) players
North Carolina Fusion U23 players
Portland Timbers (2001–2010) players
San Diego Flash players
San Diego Sockers (CISL) players
San Diego Spirit non-playing staff
San Diego Spirit
San Diego State Aztecs men's soccer players
San Diego Toreros men's soccer coaches
San Diego Toreros men's soccer players
Seattle Sounders (1994–2008) players
Soccer players from California
Sportspeople from Chula Vista, California
UC Santa Barbara Gauchos women's soccer coaches
USISL players
A-League (1995–2004) players
Virginia Tech Hokies women's soccer coaches
Wichita Wings (NPSL) players